Sainte-Clotilde-de-Horton is a municipality located in the Centre-du-Québec region of Quebec, Canada.

It was formed on March 26, 1997 by the merger of the village of Sainte-Clotilde-de-Horton, the parish municipality of Sainte-Clothilde-de-Horton (note spelling), and the municipality of Saint-Jacques-de-Horton.  Prior to February 9, 1991, the name of the village was also spelled Sainte-Clothilde-de-Horton.

References

Municipalities in Quebec
Designated places in Quebec
Incorporated places in Centre-du-Québec